Smerdomsky is a rural locality (a settlement) in Pervomayskoye Rural Settlement, Chagodoshchensky District, Vologda Oblast, Russia. The population was 751 as of 2002. There are 11 streets.

Geography 
Pervomaysky is the nearest rural locality.

References 

Rural localities in Chagodoshchensky District